Caroline Thérese af Ugglas Liljedahl (born 7 April 1972) is a Swedish singer, artist and chorister.

Af Ugglas created the format for a televised choir contest, which was picked up by NBC in the United States as the show Clash of the Choirs, and by the Seven Network in Australia as Battle of the Choirs.

Melodifestivalen
Caroline Af Ugglas has taken part so far in three Melodifestivalen events:
Melodifestivalen 2007 with the song "Tror på dig", written by herself along with Heinz Liljedahl and Mattias Torell. On 24 February 2007 she performed "Tro på dig", ending up in 6th place, which didn't qualify her any further in the contest.
Melodifestivalen 2009 with the track 'Snälla Snälla' (Please Please). It proceeded to the final where it came second, only 11 points from winning. 
Melodifestivalen 2013 with the song "Hon har inte".

Discography

Albums

Singles

Other Appearances
 1999 – Barn 2000 (sings the song "Gud")
 2007 – Scarsoul (sings the song "Hold On")

International Chart Success
 The Pmachinery Top 30: No. 3

References

External links 

Biography
Biography 2

1972 births
Living people
Swedish nobility
Articles containing video clips
21st-century Swedish women singers
Melodifestivalen contestants of 2013
Melodifestivalen contestants of 2009
Melodifestivalen contestants of 2007
Melodifestivalen contestants of 2006